Triad City Beat is a free weekly alternative newspaper with distribution in Greensboro, Winston-Salem, and High Point in North Carolina. It was founded in 2014 by Brian Clarey, Jordan Green and Eric Ginsburg, who were former editors and reporters for YES! Weekly. The newspaper primarily covers topics local to the Triad such as news, politics, culture, opinion, music, and food. It describes itself as an independent voice to hold "economic and governmental powers accountable" across the Triad and North Carolina, and as a defender of democracy, as well as "LGBTQ+ rights, racial justice and an urban sensibility". It has an estimated circulation of 10,000, and is published every Thursday.

In 2023, the Triad City Beat hired a new "CityBeat" reporter specifically to expand its coverage of city council meetings in Greensboro and Winston-Salem. The newspaper releases the CityBeat content for free use by others under the Creative Commons Attribution-No Derivatives license.

Notable reporting 
Some of the newspaper's deeper reporting includes a profile of the group Redneck Revolt, investigations into substandard housing in Greensboro  and High Point, and coverage following the in-custody homicide of a local man by the Greensboro Police Department. In September 2019, Triad City Beat broke the news of child sexual abuse allegations at a group home run by the Greensboro Deputy Chief of Police.

The New York Times has cited reports from the Triad City Beat and then-associate editor Eric Ginsburg in their front-page story and followup story concerning the disproportionate harassment of black drivers in Greensboro by city police.

The Triad City Beats independent reporting had been cited by other national media outlets besides The New York Times, including Vice, Bustle, Colorlines, and The Jewish Press. They have also been extensively cited by Triad and North Carolina outlets such as the Triad Business Journal, WUNC, WFDD, and NC Policy Watch.

Awards 
In 2016, senior editor Jordan Green won second prize for Best Political Column for newspapers with fewer than a 45,000 print run for the national group Association of Alternative Newsmedia. He also won second place in 2018, again for his column Citizen Green, and freelance reporter Jonathen Michels won third place in the Longform News category the same year. In 2019, publisher and executive editor Brian Clarey won first prize for Best Political Column. Jordan Green won third place in the same category for his column Citizen Green.

Leadership 
The newspaper lists its directors and editors as:
Publisher/Executive Editor: Brian Clarey
 Managing Editor: Sayaka Matsuoka
 Art Director: Aiden Siobhan

See also 
Yes! Weekly - another Triad alt-weekly newspaper
List of newspapers published in North Carolina

External links 
 Triad City Beat Website

References 

Weekly newspapers published in North Carolina
Independent newspapers published in the United States
Alternative weekly newspapers published in the United States
Mass media in Greensboro, North Carolina
Mass media in Winston-Salem, North Carolina
Publications established in 2014